The New York Cross Harbor Railroad Police was the law enforcement arm of the New York Cross Harbor Railroad. The NYCHRR was in existence from 1983-2006 when the operation was sold to Mid Atlantic New England Rail and it was renamed to New York New Jersey Rail.

History 
Beginning in the early 1990s, the New York Cross Harbor Railroad had its own police force. The NYCH PD employed a full-time police chief as well as about a dozen "Reserve Special Agents" led by the Reserve Superintendent of the Railroad Police.

The main duty of the NYCH PD was traffic control on freight movements that transversed First Avenue among other city thoroughfares. The NYCHRR Police Reserve held training drills on the property, as well as assisting with security during events and affairs concerning R. Diamond and Brooklyn Historic Railway Association.

Most of the Reserve Agents had been previously employed in some facet of law enforcement. The uniform was a light blue shirt, with blue jeans and work boots. A pair of patches were used, one for property protection, and the other for train protection, one on each sleeve. Gold badges were also used.

See also 

 List of law enforcement agencies in New York

References

External links 
 New York Cross Harbor Railroad page

Organizations established in 1983
Defunct law enforcement agencies of New York (state)